Evaldas Petrauskas (born 19 March 1992 in Šilutė, Lithuania) is a Lithuanian boxer. He represented Lithuania at 2010 Summer Youth Olympics and won a gold medal.

At the 2011 World Amateur Boxing Championships he lost to Jai Bhagwan (IND).
He won the Olympic qualifier and went to the 2012 Summer Olympics in London. At the 2012 Summer Olympics he won a bronze medal in the men's lightweight division.

Achievements

References

External links 
 
 
 
 

1992 births
Living people
Boxers at the 2010 Summer Youth Olympics
Sportspeople from Vilnius
Boxers at the 2012 Summer Olympics
Boxers at the 2016 Summer Olympics
Olympic boxers of Lithuania
Olympic bronze medalists for Lithuania
Olympic medalists in boxing
Medalists at the 2012 Summer Olympics
Lithuanian male boxers
Lightweight boxers
Youth Olympic gold medalists for Lithuania